The Assembly of the Republic is the unicameral legislative body of the Republic of Mozambique established in 1977.

The current parliament has 250 members who are directly elected through a system of party-list proportional representation and serve five-year terms. Parties must receive at least five percent of the vote nationally to gain parliamentary representation. Parliamentary debates and business are conducted entirely in  Portuguese. Three parties are represented in the parliament: FRELIMO, RENAMO and the Democratic Movement of Mozambique. After the 2014 election, RENAMO MPs have refused to take office, since the party considered the electoral act had been fraudulent, but they resumed their duties in February 2015.

Presidents of the Assembly
The President of the Assembly is the second-highest figure in the state hierarchy of Mozambique, and will replace the President of Mozambique in case of incapacity. The permanent position of President of the Assembly was only established in 1986. Previously the position was filled by the President of the People's Republic of Mozambique.

2019 parliamentary election results

Previous parliamentary election results

See also
History of Mozambique
Legislative Branch
List of national legislatures

References

External links
 

 
Unicameral legislatures
National legislatures